The J Curve: A New Way to Understand Why Nations Rise and Fall (Simon & Schuster: 2006) is a book by political scientist Ian Bremmer.  It was named a "Book of the Year" in 2006 by The Economist.

Bremmer's J Curve describes the relationship between a country's openness and its stability; focusing on the notion that while many countries are stable because they are open (the United States, France, Japan), others are stable because they are closed (North Korea, Cuba, Iraq under Saddam Hussein).  According to Bremmer, a government's motivations differ dramatically depending on where they fall on the J curve.

J Curve model 

The x-axis of the political J-Curve graph measures the "openness" (of freedom) of the State in question, and the y-axis measures the stability of that same state. It suggests that those states that are 'closed'/undemocratic/unfree (such as the Communist dictatorships of China and Cuba) are very stable; however, as one progresses right, along the x-axis, it is evident that stability (for relatively short period of time in the lengthy life of nations) decreases, creating a dip in the graph, until beginning to pick up again as the 'openness' of a state increases; at the other end of the graph to closed states are the open states of the West, such as the United States or the United Kingdom. Thus, a J-shaped curve is formed.

States can travel both forward (right) and backwards (left) along this J-curve, and so stability and openness are never secure. The J is steeper on the left hand side, as it is easier for a leader in an authoritarian state to create stability by closing the country than to build a civil society and establish accountable institutions; the curve is higher on the far right than left because states that prevail in opening their societies (Eastern Europe, for example) ultimately become more stable than authoritarian regimes.

Bremmer's entire curve can shift up or down depending on economic resources available to the government in question. Therefore, Saudi Arabia's relative stability at every point along the curve rises or falls depending on the price of oil; China's curve, meanwhile, analogously depends on the country's economic growth.

Quotes by the author

Applications 
David Agpar proposes The J Curve for an Iraq solution
Richard Beck on The J Curve and the Missional Church
The J Curve and Malaysia
The J Curve and Zimbabwe

References

External links 
J Curve on The Daily Show
The J Curve on BBC Newsnight Bookclub
The J Curve: Bremmer at the Council on Foreign Relations
Bill Emmott and Fareed Zakaria on The J Curve in Slate (magazine)
J Curve in the Washington Post

Reviews 
Curve an Effective Tool in US Foreign Policy, by Cecil Johnson. Review in The Boston Globe. October 1, 2006.

2006 non-fiction books
American political books
Books about international relations